Honey Lingers is the second album by Anglo-American alternative rock band Voice of the Beehive. Released in 1991 on London Records, the album earned positive reviews from music critics and was a success on U.S. college radio stations.  The album peaked at  17 in the UK upon its debut on 24 August 1991, and No. 68 in Australia in July 1992.

The first single, "Monsters and Angels", became the band's first entry on the U.S. Billboard Hot 100, peaking at No. 74.  It also was the band's second top-twenty single in the UK Singles Chart, peaking at No. 17. "Monsters and Angels" peaked at No. 72 on the Australian ARIA singles chart, and was their sole top-ten single on the U.S. Modern Rock Tracks chart, peaking at number eight.

The title of the album is a play on the words of the sexual act of cunnilingus. The album includes a cover version of The Partridge Family's "I Think I Love You", which became their biggest hit in Australia, peaking at No. 12.

The album was certified silver in the U.K. for shipments of 60,000 units.

Singles
 1991 "Monsters and Angels" No. 17 UK, No. 72 AUS, #74 U.S., #8 U.S. Modern Rock Tracks
 1991 "I Think I Love You" No. 25 UK, No. 12 AUS
 1991 "Perfect Place" No. 37 UK, No. 31 AUS

Track listing
 "Monsters and Angels" (Bryn, Jones) – 3:38
 "Adonis Blue" (Bryn, Jones) – 3:40
 "I Think I Love You" (Tony Romeo) – 3:13
 "Look at Me" (Bryn, Jones) – 3:03
 "Beauty to My Eyes" (Bryn) – 3:01
 "Just Like You" (Brett, Bryn, Jones) – 3:22
 "Little Gods" (Marvin Etzioni) – 2:37
 "I'm Shooting Cupid" (Bryn, Jones) – 3:11
 "Say It" (Bryn, Jones) – 2:28
 "Perfect Place" (Brooke, Bryn, Jones) – 3:33

Charts

References

1991 albums
Albums produced by Don Was
Albums produced by Hugh Jones (producer)
Albums produced by Alan Tarney
London Records albums
Voice of the Beehive albums